Zulu African Film Academy Awards, also known as ZAFAA Global Awards, is an annual ceremony that rewards African films in the diaspora. It has been held in London, United Kingdom since its inaugural edition in 2006. The 2015 and 2016 awards were planned to be celebrated in Africa for the first time. T

References

External links
Official website (archive)
Official Webradio webcast

African film awards
Awards established in 2006